CY Cergy Paris University (French: CY Cergy Paris Université) is a public  university located in Cergy-Pontoise, France. It was officially announced in October 2019 by the décret that the university would be founded by combining other institutions on 1 January 2020. The official status of the university is an experimental institution.

History
The university was created from the merger of several schools of the University of Paris-Seine (ComUE), Cergy-Pontoise University and the École internationale des sciences du traitement de l'information - EISTI. The École pratique de service social - EPSS  and the Institut libre d'éducation physique supérieur - ILEPS  will become component institutions of the new university.

The other schools in the old University of Paris-Seine will become members of the CY Alliance.

 ESSEC Business School - ESSEC
 ISIPCA (Institut supérieur international du parfum, de la cosmétique et de l'aromatique alimentaire)
 École nationale supérieure d’architecture de Versailles - ENSA-V
 École nationale supérieure du paysage - ENSP-V
 École nationale supérieure d'arts de Paris-Cergy - ENSAPC
 École nationale supérieure de l'électronique et de ses applications (ENSEA)
 Supméca  (Institut Supérieur de Mécanique de Paris)
 École de Biologie Industrielle - EBI
 École d'électricité, de production et des méthodes industrielles - ECAM-EPMI
 École supérieure d'Informatique, réseaux et systèmes d'information - ITESCIA
 École d'ingénieur d'agro-développement international - ISTOM

Faculties

CY SUP
All the former undergraduate faculties of the University of Cergy-Pontoise will be reorganised as a new undergraduate school which will be named CY SUP.

Graduate Schools
There will be five graduate schools:
 CY Tech, a Grande Ecole, on sciences, engineering, economy and administration, with engineering education from the EISTI
 CY Art and Humanity, in association with the ENSAPC, the ENSAV, the ENSP, and the INP
 CY Education, with the INSPÉ, the EPSS, and the ILEPS
 CY Law and Political Science
 ESSEC

Research
There will be an institut of advanced studies named CY Advanced Studies.

See also
 Education in France
 List of public universities in France by academy

References

Educational institutions established in 2020
Education in Cergy-Pontoise
Universities in Île-de-France
2020 establishments in France
Universities established in the 2020s